The following is a list of Live PD episodes, a television series that follows police officers in the course of their nighttime patrols, live broadcasting select encounters with the public.

The A&E network series premiered on October 28, 2016, with an initial order from A&E for eight two-hour episodes. On February 1, 2017, A&E announced that the season would be expanded to 21 episodes. The first season concluded on August 19, 2017, after 62 episodes, and the second season premiered on October 6, 2017 On July 20, 2018, it was announced by host Dan Abrams that an extra two-hour episode would precede the premiere of Nightwatch Nation on A&E on Thursday August 16, 2018, at 8pm EDT. A second episode then continued on the air from 10:56pm EDT to midnight EDT following the Nightwatch Nation premiere. The second season concluded on August 25, 2018, after 82 episodes. The third season premiered on September 21, 2018; prior to the season's premiere, A&E announced the series had been renewed through 2019 for an additional 150 episodes.  On Thursday, November 1, 2018, a special bonus episode aired from 8pm EDT to 10pm EDT and served as a lead-in for the second season premiere of Live PD Presents: PD Cam.  On Wednesdays, December 5 & December 12, 2018, special bonus episodes aired opposite to the premiere episodes of "Border Live" on Discovery Channel from 8pm EST to 10pm EST.  On Thursday, January 3, 2019, a special bonus episode aired from 8pm EST to 10pm EST and served as a lead-in for the fifth season premiere of 60 Days In.  On Thursday, October 17, 2019, a special bonus episode aired from 8pm EDT to 10pm EDT and served as a lead-in for the series premier of spin-off series Live PD: Wanted.

Series overview

Episodes

Season 1 (2016–17)

Season 2 (2017–18)

Season 3 (2018–19)

Season 4 (2019–20)

References

Live Pd
Live Pd
Episodes